Lucius Clodius Macer was a legatus of the Roman Empire in Africa in the time of Nero.  He revolted in May 68, cutting off the food supply of Rome, possibly at the instigation of Calvia Crispinilla.  Although encouraged by Galba, Macer raised a legion Legio I Macriana liberatrix in addition to the Legio III Augusta that he already commanded, presumably raising suspicion that Macer also harbored imperial ambitions, and in October 68 Galba had him killed by the procurator Trebonius Garutianus. Papirus, the centurion of Mucianus, was implicated in his assassination.

He produced denarii which are extremely rare today. Only about 85 are known to exist, of which only 20 bear his portrait. He uses the formulaic abbreviation S C (senatus consulto) on his denarii; this otherwise had only rarely appeared on Roman silver coins since about 40 BC. We may take this and his decision to portray himself without a laurel wreath or a diadem as evidence that he wished to portray his revolt as being against Nero, not the senate.

Sources
 Plutarch, Galba 6,1f.
 Tacitus, Histories 1,37,3; 1,7,1; 2,97,2; 4,49,4.

External links 

Clodius Lucius Macer
Ancient Roman generals
1st-century Romans
Year of birth unknown
Macer, Lucius
Roman rebels
Assassinated Roman politicians